The 2016 Missouri Valley Conference men's soccer season was the 26th season of men's varsity soccer in the conference.

The SIU Edwardsville Cougars were the defending regular season champions, while the Drake Bulldogs were the defending tournament champions.

The SIU Edwardsville Cougars defeated the host Missouri State Bears in the Missouri Valley Conference Men's Soccer Tournament final 1–0  and advanced to the NCAA tournament. The regular season champion Loyola Ramblers received an at-large bid to the tournament, giving the MVC two entries for the first time since 2011.

Loyola defeated UIC 2–0 in the first round before falling in the second round at 15th ranked and 13th seeded Notre Dame 1–0.

SIUE tied at 13th ranked Michigan State before advancing to the second round in an epic penalty kick battle 9–8. The Cougars then tied at 11th ranked and 15th seeded Butler 0–0 and advanced to the third round on penalty kicks 5–4. SIUE finally fell at 2nd ranked and 2nd seeded Wake Forest 2–1.

Changes from 2015 

The MVC expanded the conference schedule from six games to eight. Each of the seven schools played a home-and-home series with two conference opponents and single games against the other four. The teams playing home-and-home series will change each year.

Teams

Season outlook 
2016 Preseason MVC Coaches' Poll

2016 Preseason MVC All-Conference Team

† = Also on 2015 Preseason MVC All-Conference Team

Regular season

Rankings

NSCAA National Poll
Source =

West Region rankings
Source =

NCAA RPI
Source =

MVC Players of the Week

Postseason

MVC Tournament 

The second-seeded SIUE Cougars won the tournament, beating the tournament host and fifth-seeded Missouri State Bears 1–0  in the championship match. It was SIUE's second Missouri Valley Conference Men's Soccer Tournament championship.

NCAA tournament

2017 MLS SuperDraft

Honors

2016 NSCAA NCAA Division I Men's All-West Region teams
Source:

2016 CoSIDA Academic All-America teams
Source:

Second Team
James Wypych. Senior Forward, Drake, 3.57 GPA, International relations

Third Team
Clark Emerson. Junior.Defender Bradley; 4.00 GPA, Finance

2016 CoSIDA Academic All-District teams
Source: 

Only All-District players are eligible for the Academic All-America ballot.

District 5 (IL, IN, MI, OH) 
Clark Emerson. Junior. Bradley; 4.00 GPA, Finance

Kirill Likhovid, Senior, Loyola,3.53 GPA; Communication networks & security

Jacob Taylor. Junior, Bradley, 3.78 GPA, Mechanical engineering

District 6 (AR, IA, LA, MN, MO, MS, ND, SD, WI) 
Steven Enna, Junior, Drake, 3.55 GPA, Business studies

James Grunert, Senior, Drake, 3.79 GPA, Health sciences

Chris Holmes, Sophomore, Central Arkansas, 4.00 GPA, Undecided

Ben LeMay, Senior, Drake,  3.78 GPA, Pharmacy MBA

Rob Oslica, Junior. Missouri State, 3.70 GPA, Cell & molecular biology

Liam Priestley, Junior, Missouri State, 3.48 GPA, Finance

Phil Woods, Senior Missouri State, 3.82 GPA, Entertainment management

James Wypych. Senior, Drake, 3.57 GPA, International relations

2016 NSCAA NCAA Division I Men's Scholar All-America teams
Source:  

Second Team

NSCAA 2015-16 College Team Academic Award
Source: 

The National Soccer Coaches Association of America (NSCAA) annually recognizes college and high school soccer programs that have excelled in the classroom by posting a team grade point average of 3.0 or higher. Six of the MVC's seven teams were honored this year. The schools, their head coaches, and their team GPAs are:

Bradley University, Jim DeRose, 3.18

Drake University, Gareth Smith, 3.33

University of Evansville, Marshall Ray, 3.19

Loyola University of Chicago, Neil Jones, 3.20

Missouri State University, Jon Leamy, 3.02

Southern Illinois University Edwardsville, Mario Sanchez, 3.26

2016 MVC awards
Source=

2016 MVC All-Conference First Team

2016 MVC All-Conference Second Team

2016 MVC All-Freshman Team

2016 MVC All-Tournament Team
Source= 

2015 Missouri Valley Conference Men's Soccer Tournament MVP— Austin Ledbetter, SIUE

2016 MVC Men's Soccer Scholar-Athlete teams
Source= 

The criteria for the All-MVC honor parallels the CoSIDA (College Sports Information Directors of America) standards for Academic All-America voting. Nominees must be starters or important reserves with at least a 3.20 cumulative grade-point average (on a 4.00 scale). Also, students must have participated in at least 75 percent of the regular-season matches or played in the league tournament. Student-athletes must have reached sophomore athletic and academic standing at their institution (true freshmen and redshirt freshmen are not eligible) and must have completed at least one full academic year at their institution.

 # = First Team in 2015; * = Honorable Mention in 2015; % = Honorable Mention in 2014

See also 
 2016 NCAA Division I men's soccer season
 2016 Missouri Valley Conference Men's Soccer Tournament
 2016 Missouri Valley Conference women's soccer season

References 

 
2016 NCAA Division I men's soccer season